Langho railway station serves the village of Langho in the Ribble Valley in Lancashire, England.

It is one of four railway stations along the Ribble Valley Line from Blackburn to Clitheroe reopened in 1994 by British Rail and Lancashire County Council, having been closed by the British Railways as an economy measure in 1956, six years before the local passenger service over the line ceased. The station has maintained transport links with existing bus services and has its services provided by Northern Trains.

Facilities
The station is unmanned and has no ticketing provision, so these must be bought on the train or in advance of travel. The two platforms are staggered, either side of the pedestrian underpass that links them (the Clitheroe-bound one being the more northerly of the two); the original station had its platforms opposite one another but the building of new housing prevented this arrangement from being used for its replacement. Shelters are provided on each platform, along with timetable poster boards and customer help point.  Running information is also made available by automatic announcements and telephone.  No step-free access is possible, as the platforms are above street level and only reached via stairs.

Services

There is generally an hourly service daily northbound to Clitheroe and southbound to Blackburn and Manchester Victoria with extra trains during peak hours.

On Sundays in the summer, one or two trains operate from Preston or Blackpool North along the Ribble Valley Line via Clitheroe to Hellifield railway station and onwards towards Carlisle.  These terminate at Hellifield in the winter, but have onward connections for stations to Carlisle.

References

External links

Railway stations in Ribble Valley
DfT Category F2 stations
Former Lancashire and Yorkshire Railway stations
Railway stations in Great Britain opened in 1850
Railway stations in Great Britain closed in 1956
Railway stations in Great Britain opened in 1994
Reopened railway stations in Great Britain
Northern franchise railway stations